Georgia Plains (also Georgia Plain) is an unincorporated community in Franklin County, Vermont, United States.

Notes

Unincorporated communities in Franklin County, Vermont
Unincorporated communities in Vermont